Ifeanyi Ifeanyi (born 15 August 1995) is a Nigerian international footballer who plays for Uzbek club Mash'al Mubarek, as a midfielder.

Club career
Born in Lagos, Ifeanyi spent his early career with Water, MFM and Akwa United. In January 2019 he moved to Algerian club ES Sétif. He returned to Akwa United later that year, before signing for Uzbek club Mash'al Mubarek in 2020.

International career
He made his international debut for Nigeria in 2017.

References

1995 births
Living people
Nigerian footballers
Nigerian expatriate footballers
Nigeria international footballers
Association football midfielders
MFM F.C. players
Akwa United F.C. players
ES Sétif players
FK Mash'al Mubarek players
Uzbekistan Super League players
Nigerian expatriate sportspeople in Algeria
Nigerian expatriate sportspeople in Uzbekistan
Expatriate footballers in Algeria
Expatriate footballers in Uzbekistan
Nigeria A' international footballers
2018 African Nations Championship players